Edward Tracy may refer to:

 Edward D. Tracy, Confederate States Army general
 Edward G. Tracy, American pharmacist and politician from New York
 Ed Tracy, British television writer and television director

See also
 Edward Tracey, Irish boxer